The Gurage languages (Gurage: ጉራጌ), also known as Guragie, is a dialect-continuum language, which belong to the Semitic branch of the Afroasiatic language family. They are spoken by the Gurage people, who inhabit the Gurage Zone within the larger multi-ethnic Southern Nations, Nationalities, and Peoples' Region in central Ethiopia.

Overview
The Gurage dialects form what is collectively called Guragigna. Almost all of the dialects are intelligible with other dialects indicating that they have organic relationships as well as indicating that they originated from a proto-Gurage language. Guragigna and its dialects belong to the Southern subdivision of the Ethiopian Semitic languages within the Afroasiatic family. 

All the Gurage subgroups (Northern, Western, and Eastern Gurage) belong to South Ethiopic. East Gurage is related to Harari and Gafat, while Northern and Western Gurage are related to each other.

All Guragigna languages and dialects are written with the Ge'ez script. The Gurage subset of this script has 44 independent glyphs.

Languages
In the following listing, the distinction between languages and dialects follows Ethnologue.

In the Northern group
 Kistane (Soddo)
 Dialects: Soddo, Dobi (Gogot)

In the Eastern group
 Silte (Silte, formerly)
Wolane (Welene)
 Zay (Zway)

In the Western group

 Sebat Bet Gurage
 Dialects: Chaha, Ezha, Gumer, Geta, Muher, Mesqan, Inor

Sebat Bet (or Sebat Beit), in particular, is best understood as a grouping in itself; the term means literally "Seven Houses," and refers to seven specific Western Gurage groups and varieties. The position of Mesqan is still contested, as some linguists consider it part of the Western variety while others put it closer with Soddo

References

 
Western South Semitic languages
Languages of Ethiopia